Pseudotetracystis is a genus of green algae, in the family Chlorosarcinaceae.

References

External links

Scientific references

Scientific databases
 AlgaTerra database
 Index Nominum Genericorum

Chlamydomonadales genera
Chlamydomonadales